Nordbotn Church is a parish church of the Church of Norway in Hitra municipality in Trøndelag county, Norway. It is located in the village of Nordbotn on the island of Fjellværsøya. It is one of the churches for the Hitra og Fillan parish which is part of the Orkdal prosti (deanery) in the Diocese of Nidaros. The white, wooden church was built in a long church design in 1900 using plans drawn up by the architect Carl Julius Bergstrøm. The church seats about 280 people.

History

In the late 1890s, approval to build a chapel at Nordbotn was given and Carl Julius Bergstrøm was hired to design the new chapel. The new church was built in 1900 and consecrated on 4 December 1900. The new building was a long church with a sacristy on both sides of the chancel.

See also
List of churches in Nidaros

References

Hitra
Churches in Trøndelag
Long churches in Norway
Wooden churches in Norway
20th-century Church of Norway church buildings
Churches completed in 1900
1900 establishments in Norway